The Thirteenth Amendment of the Constitution Act 1992 (previously bill no. 25 of 1992) is an amendment to the Constitution of Ireland which specified that the protection of the right to life of the unborn does not limit freedom of travel in and out of the state. It was approved by referendum on 25 November 1992 and signed into law on 23 December of the same year.

On 25 May 2018, a referendum was passed to replace the current provisions on the right to life of the unborn, on travel and on information with a clause allowing legislation on the termination of pregnancy.

Background
The Eighth Amendment in 1983 had added a subsection to the Constitution acknowledging the right of the life of the unborn. In Attorney General v. X, commonly known as the X Case, the Attorney General had secured an injunction in the High Court preventing a 14-year-old girl who had become pregnant from rape from obtaining an abortion. While the Supreme Court reversed this injunction in March 1992, on the grounds that there was a risk to her life from suicide, they held that it would otherwise have been lawful. This amendment addressed this, so that the constitutional protection of unborn life could no longer restrict the freedom to travel.

It was one of three amendments which were put to a referendum on 25 November 1992, the same day as a general election. the Twelfth Amendment Bill, which would have held that the possibility of suicide was not a sufficient threat to justify an abortion, was rejected; the Fourteenth Amendment was approved, allowing freedom of access to information with respect to abortion.

Changes to the text
Insertion of a new paragraph in Article 40.3.3º:

The subsection relating to abortion had originally been added by the Eighth Amendment in 1983. With the approval of the Thirteenth Amendment and the Fourteenth Amendment, the full text of Article 40.3.3º read as the follows:

Oireachtas debates
A previous amendment to the constitution had been proposed in a private member's bill by Labour Party TD Brendan Howlin on 12 May 1992. This proposed to insert the following subsection after Article 40.3.3º:

This was defeated at Second Stage the following day by 62 votes to 67.

The Thirteenth Amendment was proposed in the Dáil by Minister for Justice Pádraig Flynn on 21 October 1992. It was passed in the Dáil on 22 October and in the Seanad on 30 October. It then proceeded to a referendum on 25 November.

Result

Deletion
On 25 May 2018, the Thirty-sixth Amendment of the Constitution Bill 2018 was passed by referendum. After it was signed into law, it replaced the previous text of Article 40.3.3º with the following text:

See also
Politics of the Republic of Ireland
History of the Republic of Ireland
November 1992 Irish constitutional referendum
C Case

References

External links
Thirteenth Amendment of the Constitution Act 1992
Referendum (Amendment) (No. 2) Act 1992
Full text of the Constitution of Ireland
Oireachtas Debate: Thirteenth Amendment of the Constitution Bill 1992

1992 in Irish law
1992 in Irish politics
1992 referendums
13
13
13
13
November 1992 events in Europe
Amendment, 13